Carex nivalis is a species of sedge that was first described by Francis Boott in 1845. It is found from Afghanistan to southwest China. The name has also been used as a synonym for Carex micropoda.

References

nivalis
Plants described in 1845